Pycnoporus coccineus is a saprophytic, white-rot decomposer fungus in the family Polyporaceae. A widely distributed species, the fungus was first described scientifically by Elias Magnus Fries in 1851. A study conducted by Couturier al et. (2015) concluded that the combined analysis of sugar and solid residues showed the suitability of P. coccineus secreted enzymes for softwood degradation. P. coccineus is a promising model to better understand the challenges of softwood biomass deconstruction and its use in biorefinery processes.

References

External links

 Aboriginal use of fungi, from Australian National Botanic Gardens

Fungi described in 1851
Fungi of Asia
Fungi of Australia
Fungi of Europe
Fungi of New Zealand
Fungi of North America
Polyporaceae
Taxa named by Elias Magnus Fries